A number of vessels have born the name Fanny:

 Fanny was launched in 1774 and was renamed . She spent much of her career, under either name, as a West Indiaman. She was last listed in 1796.
 , a merchant ship that transported convicts to Australia in 1816
 , an armed merchantman that sailed between Liverpool and South America
 , a merchant ship that transported convicts to Australia in 1833
 , a propeller-driven, small Confederate States Navy steamer
 Fanny Nicholson, an Australian sailing ship that sank in 1872

See also
 Fannie (pilot boat), built in 1860 for the New York City and Sandy Hook pilots

Ship names